The Apostolic Nuncio to Czechoslovakia was an ecclesiastical office of the Roman Catholic Church, established in 1920 and lasting, with significant interruptions, until 1993. It was a diplomatic post of the Holy See, whose representative is called the Apostolic Nuncio with the rank of an ambassador. The office of the nunciature was located in Prague.

History
The relationship between the Holy See and the government of Czechoslovakia was strained more often than not. In the 1920s, Apostolic Nuncio Francesco Marmaggi left Prague to protest public celebrations of the Czech national hero Jan Hus, a heretic in the eyes of the Church. Years of negotiations established a new working relationship, but the Vatican failed to persuade the Czechs to allow Marmaggi to return as nuncio, not even a face-saving few weeks. World War II ended normal relations, and the Holy See sought a diplomatic middle ground by granting recognition to the Slovak Republic, a Nazi client state, but sent a chargé d’affaires rather than a nuncio. 

Relations were restored only briefly after the war before the new Communist government expelled the nuncio and terminated diplomatic relations. Finally, with the fall of the Soviet Union, the parties renewed their old ties, but in less than three years Czechoslovakia divided into the Czech Republic and Slovakia, and the Apostolic Nuncio to Czechoslovakia became nuncio to both of those new nations.

List of papal representatives to Czechoslovakia
Apostolic nuncios
Clemente Micara (15 May 1920 - 30 May 1923)
Francesco Marmaggi (30 May 1923 - 13 February 1928)
Pietro Ciriaci (15 February 1928 - 9 January 1934)
Saverio Ritter (5 August 1935 - 1939)
Giovanni Coppa (30 June 1990 – 1 January 1993)

See also
Ottavio De Liva, nunciature secretary expelled in 1950
Apostolic Nunciature to the Czech Republic
Apostolic Nunciature to Slovakia
List of diplomatic missions of the Holy See
Foreign relations of the Holy See

Notes

References

Czechoslovakia